The 2021 NAB AFL Women's Under-19 Championships is the eleventh national under-18/19 girls Australian rules football competition. The tournament, which was previously held in 2019 and not in 2020 due to the COVID-19 pandemic, was played in April and May and featured eight teams. Due to the pandemic, no winner was declared; instead, a series of challenge matches were played.

Age eligibility
The tournament is usually an under-18s competition; however, due to no championships being staged in 2020 due to the impact of the COVID-19 pandemic, the 2021 edition was increased to an under-19 level.

Format and teams
Eight teams competed in the championships: Vic Metro, Vic Country, South Australia, Western Australia, Queensland, the Allies (representing the Northern Territory, Tasmania, New South Wales and the Australian Capital Territory), the Woomeras (an Indigenous under-17 representative program), and the Medleys (a multicultural under-17 representative program). The tournament was originally scheduled to begin in March, and two matches were played; however, due to travel restrictions imposed as a result of a spike of COVID-19 cases in Brisbane, these matches were regarded as "challenge" matches and did not contribute to the overall rankings of the championships. When only the official matches are included, each team only played two matches against randomly scheduled opponents.

Fixtures

All-Australian team
The 2021 Women's Under-19 All-Australian team was selected by a panel of experts, including AFL chair Kevin Sheehan, Tarkyn Lockyer (AFL national talent head coach), Samantha Virgo (Gold Coast), Trent Moseby (Richmond), Todd Patterson (Melbourne) and Jess Smith (AFL National Female Talent Manager).

Team MVPs
At the conclusion of the tournament each competing team named their best player for the tournament. The winner of these 'most valuable player' awards are as follows:

References

2021
2021 in Australian rules football
2021 in Australian women's sport